Cottbus – Spree-Neiße is an electoral constituency (German: Wahlkreis) represented in the Bundestag. It elects one member via first-past-the-post voting. Under the current constituency numbering system, it is designated as constituency 64. It is located in southeastern Brandenburg, comprising the independent city of Cottbus and the district of Spree-Neiße.

Cottbus – Spree-Neiße was created for the inaugural 1990 federal election after German reunification. Since 2021, it has been represented by Maja Wallstein of the Social Democratic Party (SPD).

Geography
Cottbus – Spree-Neiße is located in eastern Brandenburg. As of the 2021 federal election, it comprises the independent city of Cottbus and the district of Spree-Neiße.

History
Cottbus – Spree-Neiße was created after German reunification in 1990, then known as Cottbus – Guben – Forst. It acquired its current name in the 2002 election. In the 1990 through 1998 elections, it was constituency 280 in the numbering system. In the 2002 and 2005 elections, it was number 64. In the 2009 election, it was number 65. Since the 2013 election, it has been number 64.

Originally, the constituency comprised the independent city of Cottbus and the districts of Guben and Forst. It acquired its current configuration and borders in the 2002 election.

Members
The constituency was first represented by Michael Wonneberger of the Christian Democratic Union (CDU) from 1990 to 1994. Werner Labsch of the Social Democratic Party (SPD) was elected in 1994 and served until 2002, followed by Wilfried Schreck from 2002 to 2005 and Steffen Reiche from 2005 to 2009. Wolfgang Nešković of The Left won the constituency in 2009. After leaving the party and becoming an independent in 2012, he was defeated seeking re-election in 2013. Klaus-Peter Schulze of the CDU was elected in 2013. Maja Wallstein regained the constituency for the SPD in 2021.

Election results

2021 election

2017 election

2013 election

2009 election

Notes

References

Federal electoral districts in Brandenburg
Spree-Neiße
Cottbus
1990 establishments in Germany
Constituencies established in 1990